The 2007 Women's European Union Amateur Boxing Championships were held in the Palais St Sauveurs in Lille, France, from December 4 to 8. This was the 2nd edition of this annual competition, and was organised by the European governing body for amateur boxing, EABA.

76 fighters representing 15 federations competed in 13 weight divisions. France, the host country, was the most successful with 3 gold, 1 silver and 4 bronze medals.

Medal winners

Medal count table

References 

2007 in French sport
European Union Amateur Boxing Championships
2007
International boxing competitions hosted by France